The Silent Family Silent Glider M is a German ultralight trike motor glider, designed by Helmut Grossklaus and produced by Silent Family of Westerrade. The aircraft is supplied as a complete ready-to-fly-aircraft.

Design and development
The Silent Glider M was designed to comply with the Fédération Aéronautique Internationale microlight category and the US FAR 103 Ultralight Vehicles rules. It features a cable-braced rigid hang glider-style high-wing, weight-shift pitch controls and aerodynamic roll controls, a single-seat enclosed cockpit with a bubble canopy, retractable tricycle landing gear and a single engine in pusher configuration.

The aircraft is made from composites, with its double surface rigid wing mounted with the pitch control bar though a slot in the bubble canopy. The pilot seating position is reclined. Various rigid wings can be used and the typical one has a  span. The powerplant is a single cylinder, air-cooled, two-stroke,  Hirth F33 engine or, optionally, a Geiger or Flytec electric motor, powering a two-bladed folding composite propeller.

The Silent Glider M can use the Aeros Stalker, A-I-R Atos or Flight Design Exxtacy wings, which are provided by the builder. The fuselage and wing combination produces a 20:1 glide ratio and a minimum sink rate of 0.8 m/s (160 ft/min).

Variants
Silent Glider M
Version powered by a  Hirth F33 gasoline engine
Silent Glider e-M
Version powered by a Geiger electric motor, introduced in 2009
Silent Glider ME
Version powered by a Flytec HPD10 electric motor

Specifications (Silent Glider M)

References

External links

2000s German sport aircraft
2000s German ultralight aircraft
Single-engined pusher aircraft
Ultralight trikes